The Portable Film Festival was an online channel and film festival. It promoted film access to portable devices.

History

Based in Melbourne, Australia, the first Portable Film Festival was launched online in September, 2006. It featured 67 pieces of content from over 250 submissions. Melburnians Andrew Apostola, 25, and Simon Goodrich, 24, founded the festival to explore the art of portable filmmaking and viewing. 

The second festival began on 1 August 2007, and included 150 international entries in five categories in 2007.

In its third year the 2008 Portable Film Festival showcased over 160 films from 39 different countries, chosen from nearly 550 submission.

In 2009 the festival featured over 180 films. The entire catalogue of films can be still found on YouTube.

Categories
Content is currently divided into six categories; 
Short Film
Music Video
Get Animated
Look at Me (online webisodes/video blogging),
First Hand Capture (captured footage from mobile phones and digital cameras)
Feature Film

Festival winners

2007 winners

2008 winners

|

Notable inclusions

I Have Seen the Future- Cam Christansen: previously featured at Sundance and Toronto International Film Festivals, winner of the Jury Award for best Animated Film at Los Angeles International Film Festival.

Film the Future

As a part of the Victoria State of Design Festival 2009, Portable Film Festival held film making competition themed on futuristic movies. Finalist's films were shown in Federation Square, Melbourne, during 15 – 25 July.

References

External links
 Portable Film Festival

Film festivals established in 2006
Film festivals in Melbourne
Internet film festivals